The Porsche 930 is a sports car manufactured by German automobile manufacturer Porsche between 1975 and 1989, known to the public as the 911 Turbo. It was the maker's top-of-the-range 911 model for its entire production duration and, at the time of its introduction, was the fastest production car available in Germany.

Model history
Porsche began experimenting with turbocharging technology on their race cars during the late 1960s, and in 1972 began development on a turbocharged version of the 911. Porsche originally needed to produce the car in order to comply with homologation regulations and had intended on marketing it as a street legal race vehicle like the 1973 Carrera 2.7 RS. The FIA's Appendix "J” rules upon which the 911 Turbo Carrera RSR 2.1 was entered into competition in 1974 changed in 1975 and 1976. The FIA announced that cars for Group 4 and Group 5 had to be production cars and be available for sale to individual purchasers through manufacturer dealer networks. For the 1976 season, new FIA regulations required manufacturers to produce 400 cars within a twenty-four-month period to gain approval for Group 4. Group 5 would require the car to be derived from a homologated model in Group 3 or 4. Porsche's Group 4 entry was the 934, homologated on 6 December 1975. For Group 5, Porsche would develop one of the most successful racing cars of the time, the 935. The 911 Turbo was put into production in 1975. While the original purpose of the 911 Turbo was to gain homologation for the 1976 racing season, it quickly became popular among car enthusiasts. Four hundred cars were produced by the end of 1975. Since Porsche wanted to compete in the 1976 season, they gained FIA homologation for the Porsche Turbo for Group 4 in Nr. 645 on 6 December 1975 and the 1,000th 911 Turbo was completed on 5 May 1976.

Ernst Fuhrmann adapted the turbo-technology originally developed for the 917/30 CAN-AM car and applied it to the 3.0 litre flat-six used in Carrera RS 3.0, thus creating what Porsche internally dubbed as the 930. The car utilises a single KKK turbocharger.

The engine has a compression ratio of 6.5:1. In order to ensure that the platform could make the most of the higher power output, a revised suspension, larger brakes and a stronger gearbox became part of the package, although some consumers were unhappy with Porsche's use of a four-speed transmission whilst a five-speed manual transmission was available in the "lower trim" Carrera. A "whale tail" rear spoiler was installed to help vent more air to the engine and to create more downforce at the rear of the vehicle, and wider rear wheels with upgraded tires combined with flared wheel arches were implemented in order to increase the car's width and grip, making it more stable.

Porsche badged the vehicle simply as "Turbo" (although early U.S. units were badged as "Turbo Carrera") and introduced the vehicle at the Paris Auto Show in October 1974 before putting it on sale in the spring of 1975; export to the United States began in 1976.

The 930 proved very fast but also very demanding to drive, and due to its short wheelbase and rear engine layout, was prone to oversteer and turbo-lag. It acquired the nickname "the Widowmaker" after several crashes and deaths attributed to its handling characteristics, which were unfamiliar to many drivers. Under certain conditions, applying too much throttle would cause the heavy rear end of the car to swing outward like a pendulum, causing the car to spin out. To this day, Porsche corporate employees who drive 911 Turbo models for testing or for business reasons are mandated to undergo "Turbo Training", despite the fact that newer 911 Turbo models are generally safer and easier to drive. 

The suspension benefitted from new anti-roll bars, firmer shock absorbers and larger diameter rear torsion bars. Porsche also upgraded the brakes to units similar to those used on the 917 race car. While the increase in displacement and addition of an intercooler increased power output and torque, these changes also increased the weight of the vehicle, especially the engine, which contributed to a substantial change in the handling and character of the car compared to the earlier 3.0-litre models.

Changing emissions regulations in Japan and the United States forced Porsche to withdraw the 930 from those markets in 1980. It however remained available in Canada. Envisioning the luxurious 928 gran turismo eventually replacing the 911 as the top of the Porsche model lineup, Fuhrmann cut back further development on the model, and it was not until his resignation that the company finally committed the financing to update the car's emissions systems, and recertify the 930 for sale in all markets.

With the so-called Werksleistungssteigerung (WLS, "Works Performance Increase") add-on came a quad-pipe exhaust system and an additional oil-cooler requiring a remodelled front spoiler and units bearing the add-on often featured additional ventilation holes in the rear fenders and modified rockers.

By the 1985 model year, 928 sales had risen slightly, but the question remained as to whether it would supersede the 911 as the company's premier model. At the same time Porsche introduced targa and cabriolet variants, both of which proved popular.

Porsche discontinued the 930 after the 1989 model year when its underlying "G-Series" platform was being replaced by the 964. The 1989 models were the first and last versions of the 930 to feature the Getrag G50 five-speed manual transmission. A turbocharged variant of the 964 officially succeeded the 930 in 1991 with a modified version of the same 3.3-litre flat-six engine and a five-speed transmission.

Flatnose (Slantnose 930S)

Kremer Racing had originally begun offering conversion kits for 930 Turbo models which included front bodywork like the famous 935 race car in 1981. In 1982, TAG Heuer co-owner Mansour Ojjeh commissioned Porsche to develop a road-legal version of the 935 race car. The final product was developed using a body shell of the 930 and fitting fabricated 935 body panels to it. The one-off also had the suspension and brakes shared with the 935 race car. Other special features of the car included special paintwork called Brilliant Red by the manufacturer, BBS wheels and the use of the 3.3-litre turbocharged flat-6 engine of the 934 race car. The car proved very popular among enthusiasts and prospective buyers began to demand a similar car as a factory offering. Porsche offered a "Flachbau" ("flatnose" or "slantnose") 930 under the "Sonderwunschprogramm" (special order program) from 1986 model year, an otherwise normal 930 with a 935-style slantnose instead of the normal 911 front end with the replacement of the famous "bug eye" headlamps with pop-up units.

Each Flachbau unit was handcrafted by remodeling the front fenders (option code M505 for the US and M506 elsewhere). A limited number of units were produced due to the fact that the package commanded a high premium price, an initial premium of up to 60 per cent (highly individualised cars requiring even more) over the standard price. 948 units were built in total with 160 of them being imported to the US. The Flachbau units delivered in Europe usually featured the  WLS performance kit.

Independently tested performance data 

Car and Driver recorded a 0–60 mph acceleration time of 4.9 seconds for both the 1975 and 1978 Porsche 911 Turbo, they shared first place in the magazine's "quickest cars of the 1970s" ranking with a 0.4-second lead.

TAG Turbo 

In the 1980s, Porsche built twin-turbocharged 1.5-litre V6 engines for the McLaren Formula One team. The engine was given the code TTE P01 and was fitted in the McLaren MP4/2 and MP4/3 generating  depending on track conditions.
The engine was financed by Luxembourgian holdings company Techniques d'Avant Garde (TAG), leading to the engine being branded as the TAG Turbo. A Porsche 930 Turbo was used as a test mule by McLaren in order to test the engine's capability. The car was exterior-wise similar to the standard 930 Turbo but featured RUF sourced wheels instead of the standard Fuchs units, a taller whale tail rear spoiler in order to accommodate a large pair of intercoolers and a new front bumper. The changes to the interior consisted of racing bucket seats and a new TAG branded tachometer with a 10,000 rpm redline. 

In September 2018, English automotive company Lanzante introduced a new model based on the same principle at the RennSport Reunion VI. The company obtained permission from McLaren to produce the model and bought 11 of those engines originally installed in the F1 cars for this purpose from the manufacturer. Cosworth is tasked to restore the engines. Each of the 11 cars fitted with the engines would come with a plaque signifying the engine's race history, engine number and the car's production number. The Lanzante display car's engine was originally fitted in 1984 to Niki Lauda's MP4/2 in which he won the British GP.

Gallery

Citations

General and cited references 
 Bongers, Marc (2004). Porsche - Serienfahrzeuge und Sportwagen seit 1948 (first edition). Motorbuch Verlag. .
 Peter Vann and C Beker, M Jurgens, M Kockritz, E Schimpf (2004). Porsche Turbo: The Full History of the Race and Production Cars. Motorbooks International, USA. .

External links 
 

930
1980s cars
Cars introduced in 1975
Cars discontinued in 1989
Cars powered by boxer engines
Rear-engined vehicles
Rear-wheel-drive vehicles
Sports cars